Vladimír Sommer (28 February 1921 in Dolní Jiřetín near Most – 8 September 1997 in Prague) was a Czech composer.

Sommer began his studies at the Prague Conservatory, where he studied violin with Bedřich Voldan and composition with Karel Janeček.  He then continued his education at the Academy of Arts and Music with Pavel Bořkovec. His first job was a composition teacher, and he eventually became a professor in the Music Department of Charles University.  Sommer wrote three symphonies, an overture, one cello concerto and one violin concerto, chamber music, and choral pieces. He died in 1997 in Prague.

Selected works
Sonata for two Violins, 1948  
Violin Concerto in G minor, 1950
Antigone, Overture to the Tragedy of Sophocles, 1957  
Vocal Symphony for Contralto, Speaker, Choir, and Orchestra, 1958 
Prince Bajaja, Orchestral Suite, 1970  
Symphony for Strings, 1977 
Sinfonia da Requiem for Soloists, Choir, and Orchestra, 1978 
Concerto for Violoncello and Orchestra, 1979 
Piano Sonata, 1980 
String Quartet in B minor, 1981
String Quartet in D minor, 1955

References
 
The information in this article is based on that in its German equivalent.

External links
Vladimir Sommer Biography (in Czech)

1921 births
1997 deaths
Czech classical composers
Czech male classical composers
20th-century classical composers
People from Horní Jiřetín
Prague Conservatory alumni
Academic staff of Charles University
20th-century Czech male musicians
Czechoslovak musicians